Siempre is the fourth studio album by the classical crossover vocal group Il Divo. It was released on 21 November 2006 in the United States and globally on 27 November 2006 by Syco Music and Columbia Records.

Background
According to producer Steve Mac in an interview with HitQuarters, preparation for the album would involve Simon Cowell compiling a list of around 200 potential songs. Cowell would then whittle this number down to around 40 which he then presented to Mac for consideration. Mac would then tell Cowell which of these would or would not work. When the song list had been reduced to around 18 or 19 songs Mac would then try out the songs with the band to see which worked for them. 15 songs would then be recorded for the album.

The songs on Siempre ("Always" in Spanish) include new arrangements of "Nights in White Satin" (originally by The Moody Blues), "Caruso", "Without You", "Somewhere", "You Raise Me Up", a new version of the song "Music" from the 1970s renamed "Musica", and re-arranged by its original British composer John Miles. The album also features a cover of Bryan Adams' "Have You Ever Really Loved a Woman?" translated into the Spanish "Un regalo que te dio la vida" (which literally means "A Gift That Life Gave You"). The album includes the Spanish adaptation by the famous Mexican composer and musician Armando Manzanero of "Una noche" ("One Night", Spanish). Other original songs in this album include "La vida sin amor" ("Life without Love," Spanish), and "Come primavera" ("Like Spring", Italian).

Track listing

Notes
 In the United States, varying stores had the rights to different songs from their Live at the Greek DVD, which were used to make up an exclusive live bonus track, ensuring that an album of 11 tracks was released to the US like every other country would receive.

Charts

Weekly charts

Year-end charts

Certifications

References

2006 albums
Columbia Records albums
Il Divo albums
Syco Music albums